Elk Creek is a stream in the U.S. state of South Dakota.

Elk Creek was named for the elk pioneer settlers saw near the stream.

See also
List of rivers of South Dakota

References

Rivers of Lawrence County, South Dakota
Rivers of Meade County, South Dakota
Rivers of South Dakota